Yangiariq (Янгиариқ, يەڭىەرىق; , Jangiaryk) is an urban-type settlement and seat of Yangiariq District in Xorazm Region in Uzbekistan. Its population was 8,824 people in 1989, and 12,200 in 2016.

Sheikh Mukhtar-Vali Complex, a mausoleum nominated for World Heritage status in 1996, is located 5 km Southwest of the village.

References

Populated places in Xorazm Region
Urban-type settlements in Uzbekistan